Mass-Observation is a United Kingdom social research project; originally the name of an organisation which ran from 1937 to the mid-1960s, and was revived in 1981 at the University of Sussex.

Mass-Observation originally aimed to record everyday life in Britain through a panel of around 500 untrained volunteer observers who either maintained diaries or replied to open-ended questionnaires (known as directives).  The organisation also paid investigators to anonymously record people's conversation and behaviour at work, on the street and at various public occasions, including public meetings and sporting and religious events.

Origins

The creators of the Mass-Observation project were three former students from Cambridge: anthropologist Tom Harrisson (who left Cambridge before graduating), poet Charles Madge and filmmaker Humphrey Jennings. Collaborators included literary critic William Empson, photographers Humphrey Spender and Michael Wickham, collagist Julian Trevelyan, novelists Inez Pearn and G.B. Edwards, spiritualist medium Rosemary Brown, journalist Anne Symonds, and painters William Coldstream and Graham Bell.  Run on a shoestring budget with money from their own pockets and the occasional philanthropic contribution or book advance, the project relied primarily on its network of volunteer correspondents.

Harrisson had set up his base in a working-class street in the northern English industrial town of Bolton (known in Mass-Observation publications as "Worktown"), in order to "systematically... record human activity in this industrial town" (Madge & Harrisson, 1938:7) using a variety of observational methods. Meanwhile, Madge, from his London home, had started to form a group of fellow-poets, artists and film-makers under the name "Mass-Observation".  The two teams began their collaboration in early 1937.

An important early focus was King Edward VIII's abdication in 1936 to marry divorcée Wallis Simpson, and the succession of George VI.  Dissatisfied with the pronouncements of the newspapers as to the public mood, the project's founders initiated a nationwide effort to document the feelings of the populace about important current events by collecting anecdotes, overheard comments, and "man-in-the-street" interviews on and around the coronation of King George VI and Queen Elizabeth on 12 May 1937.

Their first published report, "May the Twelfth: Mass-Observation Day-Surveys 1937 by over two hundred observers" was published in book form.  The result tended to subvert the Government's efforts at image-making.  The principal editors were Humphrey Jennings and Charles Madge, with the help of T. O. Beachcroft, Julian Blackburn, William Empson, Stuart Legg and Kathleen Raine.  The 1987 reprint contains an afterword by David Pocock, director of the Tom Harrisson Mass-Observation archive.

In August 1939, Mass-Observation invited members of the public to record and send them a day-to-day account of their lives in the form of a diary. No special instructions were given to these diarists so they vary greatly in their style, content and length. 480 people responded to this invitation and their diaries are now held in the organisation's archive.

Impact
During the Second World War, Mass-Observation research was occasionally influential in shaping British public policy. In 1939 Mass-Observation publicly criticised the Ministry of Information's posters, which led to their being replaced with more appropriate ones. In addition, their study of saving habits was successfully used by John Maynard Keynes to argue for tax policy changes. During the war, there were also a few cases of Mass Observation (MO) doing research on commission for government authorities trying to shape recruiting and war propaganda: Mary Adams, for example, employed MO on commission for the Ministry of Information.

Criticism

Mass-Observation has been criticised by some as an invasion of privacy. Participants were not only reporting on their own lives; they often commented on their neighbours and friends as well. Such an atmosphere of surveillance was in keeping with the rising culture of espionage, which dominated the Second World War, although Mass-Observation was an independent, not a government, effort aimed at education rather than manipulation of the public.

Mass-Observation had set out to turn the tools of anthropology used to study foreign cultures to study Britain's: to be "The Science of Us."  Criticism of the scientific validity focusing on the experimental parameters began fairly early, continued throughout its existence, and was a key element in its eventual demise.  Because of the self-selecting nature of the observers, they did not represent a scientifically balanced cross-section of British society as a modern public opinion poll would.  Although geographically and occupationally diverse, the participants tended to be middle-class, educated, literate, and left of centre.

Decline and end
Following the war, and the departure of project founders Harrisson, Madge, and Jennings, research began to focus on the commercial habits of the country rather than the broader cultural research that characterised its first decade.  This turn towards market research was formalised in 1949 when the project was incorporated as a private firm and, under new management, became registered as a market research limited company, Mass Observation (UK) Limited. Eventually the firm was merged with the advertising agency J. Walter Thompson's UK research agency BMRB, to form MRB International, followed by a full merger in the early 1990s.

Relaunch

A re-evaluation of the Mass-Observation archives led to a relaunch of the project in 1981. Today, housed at the University of Sussex, Mass-Observation continues to collect the thoughts of its panel of writers through regular questionnaires (known as directives) and is used by students, academics, media researchers and the public for its unique collection of material on everyday life in Britain.

The Mass-Observation archive of materials is currently housed in The Keep, an archive housing East Sussex and Brighton and Hove councils' historical record.

Publications
Mass-Observation (Charles Madge & Tom Harrisson), Mass-Observation (pamphlet), London, Frederick Muller, 1937.
Charles Madge & Humphrey Jennings, eds. May the Twelfth, Mass-Observation Day-Surveys 1937, by over two hundred observers, London, Faber and Faber, 1937. 
Charles Madge & Tom Harrisson, First Year's Work, London, Lindsay Drummond, 1938.
Charles Madge & Tom Harrisson, Britain, Harmondsworth, Penguin Books, 1939.
Mass-Observation, War Begins at Home, London, Chatto & Windus, 1940.
Mass-Observation, Clothes Rationing, Advertising Service Guild, 1941
Mass-Observation, Home Propaganda, Advertising Service Guild, 1941
Mass-Observation, The Pub and the People, London, Gollancz, 1943; reprinted Seven Dials Press, 1971.
Mass-Observation, War Factory, London, Gollancz, 1943.
Mass-Observation, People's Homes, London, John Murray/Advertising Service Guild, 1943
Mass-Observation, The Journey Home, London, John Murray/Advertising Service Guild, 1944
Mass-Observation, Britain and her Birth Rate, London, John Murray/Advertising Service Guild, 1945
Mass-Observation, Peace and the Public - A Study, London, Longmans, Green, 1947
Mass-Observation (Herbert Wilcox), Juvenile Delinquency, London, Falcon press, 1949.
Mass-Observation (with illustrations by Ronald Searle), Meet Yourself at the Doctors, London, Naldrett Press, 1949
Mass-Observation (with illustrations by Ronald Searle), Meet Yourself on Sunday, London, Naldrett Press, 1949
Tom Harrisson, Britain Revisited, London, Gollancz, 1961.
Tom Harrisson, Living through the Blitz, London, Collins, 1976.

A number of publications are also available from the University of Sussex. The following selection of titles also gives some idea of the scope of Mass Observation's work:

Attitudes to AIDS
Bolton Working Class Life
Children's Millennium Diaries
Everyday use of social relaxants and stimulants
Gender and Nationhood. Britain in the Falklands War
Health, sickness and the work ethic, Helen Busby (2000)
Looking at Europe: pointers to some British attitudes
Researching women's lives: notes from visits to East Central Europe
Mass-Observation: des 'capsules' de vie quotidienne
One Day in the Life of Television, ed. Sean Day-Lewis (1989)
Sex surveyed, 1949–1994 – The actual Mass-Observation survey was called Little Kinsey; the results were published in a book by Liz Stanley under the above title.
Pub and the People: A Worktown study ed. Tom Harrisson (1943)
Weeping in the Cinema in 1950, Sue Harper and Vincent Porter (1995)

Since the archive was moved and re-established at Sussex University, a number of books based on the diaries commissioned by Mass-Observation in 1939 have been published. These include:

Among You Taking Notes. The Wartime Diary of Naomi Mitchison ed. Dorothy Sheridan. 1985 (Victor Gollancz). 2000 (Phoenix)
Our Hidden Lives, The Everyday Diaries of Forgotten Britain between 1945–48 ed. Simon Garfield 2005 (Ebury Press)
Love and War in London. A Woman's Diary 1939–42 by Olivia Cockett, ed. Robert Malcolmson.  2005 (Wilfrid Laurier University Press).  2008 (The History Press)
We Are At War. The Diaries of Five Ordinary People in Extraordinary Times ed. Simon Garfield 2006 (Ebury press)
Nella Last's War ed. Richard Broad and Suzie Fleming, 1981 (Falling Wall Press). 2006 (Profile Books)
Private Battles: How the War Almost Defeated Us ed. Simon Garfield 2007 (Ebury press)
Nella Last’s Peace, covering the years 1945–8. ed. Patricia and Robert Malcolmson,   2008 (Profile Books)
Our Longest Days - a People's History of the Second World War, an anthology ed. Sandra Koa Wing 2008 (Profile Books)
Wartime Women. A Mass Observation Anthology ed. Dorothy Sheridan 1990 (Heinemann). 2009 (Phoenix Press)
Dorset in Wartime: The Diary of Phyllis Walther 1941-1942 ed. Patricia Malcolmson and Robert Malcolmson 2009 (Dorset Record Society)

See also:

 Hubble, Nick. Mass-Observation and Everyday Life. Houndmills-Basingstoke: Palgrave Macmillan. 2006. . A history of the Mass-Observation movement from a former Research Fellow at the Mass-Observation Archive, University of Sussex, UK (from back cover).

Findings of Mass-Observation have also played a large part in such works of social history as Joe Moran's Queuing for Beginners.

See also
One Day in History – a similar project undertaken in 2006
Nella Last
Housewife, 49, a TV movie based on Nella Last's diary.

References

Further reading
 Baker, James, and David Geiringer, "Space, text and selfhood: encounters with the personal computer in the mass observation project archive, 1991–2004", Contemporary British History, vol. 33, no. 3 (2019), pp. 293–312.
 Hall, David. Worktown: The Astonishing Story of the Birth of Mass-Observation (2015)
 Hinton, James. The Mass Observers: A History, 1937-1949 (2013).
 Langhamer, Claire, "Mass observing the atom bomb: the emotional politics of August 1945", Contemporary British History, vol. 33, no. 2 (2019), pp. 208–225.

Primary sources
 Garfield, Simon, ed. Private Battles: Our Intimate Diaries: How the War Almost Defeated Us, 2007 - from the Mass Observation collection
 Sheridan, Dorothy, ed. Wartime Women: A Mass-Observation Anthology, 1937-45, 2000

External links

University of Sussex Mass Observation site
"Surveillance society: The Mass-Observation movement and the meaning of everyday life." by Caleb Crain in The New Yorker, 11 September 2006.
Photography taken by Humphrey Spender for the Mass-Observation project in Bolton

Public opinion
British culture
Demographic history of the United Kingdom
History of the Metropolitan Borough of Bolton
University of Sussex
Anthropology organizations
Organizations established in 1937
Social statistics data